The 2021 Asian Le Mans Series was the ninth season of the Automobile Club de l'Ouest's Asian Le Mans Series. It is the fourth 24 Hours of Le Mans-based series created by the ACO, following the American Le Mans Series (since merged with the Rolex Sports Car Series to form the United SportsCar Championship), the European Le Mans Series and the FIA World Endurance Championship. The four-event season began at the Dubai Autodrome in Dubai on 13 February 2021 and ended at the Yas Marina Circuit in Abu Dhabi on 20 February 2021.

Calendar
The calendar for the 2021 season was announced on 13 January 2021.

This Asian Le Mans Series season was run, in its entirety in the Middle East, in the United Arab Emirates at the Dubai Autodrome in Dubai and Yas Marina Circuit in Abu Dhabi in February 2021.

The season continued to comprise four four-hour length races. The races ran on the two circuits and combined night, day and twilight racing.

Entry list

LMP2

LMP3

GT

Results
Bold indicates overall winner.

Teams Championships
Points are awarded according to the following structure:

LMP2 Teams Championship

LMP2 Am Teams Championship

LMP3 Teams Championship

GT Teams Championship

GT Am Teams Championship

Driver's championships
Points are awarded according to the following structure:

LMP2 Drivers Championship

LMP2 Am Drivers Championship

LMP3 Drivers Championship

GT Drivers Championship

GT Am Drivers Championship

References

External links
 

Asian Le Mans Series seasons
Asian Le Mans Series
Asian Le Mans
Le Mans Series